Theresa Kachindamoto is the paramount chief, or Inkosi, of the Dedza District in the central region of Malawi. 
She has informal authority over more than 900,000 people. She is known for her forceful action in dissolving child marriages and insisting on education for both girls and boys.

Background

Theresa Kachindamoto is the youngest of twelve siblings in a family of traditional rulers in the Dedza District around Lake Malawi.
She worked as a secretary  for 27 years at  a College in Zomba District in southern Malawi.
She married and became the mother of five boys.
In 2003, the chiefs of Dedza district chose her as the next senior chief of the district, with over 900,000 people.
She said she had been chosen because she was "good with people" and was now senior chief whether she liked it or not.
She accepted the position and returned to Monkey Bay, where she assumed the traditional red robes, beads and leopardskin headband.
Theresa became the Inkosi of the Chidyaonga line of the Maseko or Gomani dynasty as Kachindamoto VII in succession to Justino Kachindamoto VI, who had held the title from 1988 to 2001 after the regency of Sunduzeni from 2001 to 2003.

Child marriage prevention

Malawi is one of the poorest countries in the world, and has an HIV infection rate of 10% of the population.
A United Nations survey in 2012 found that more than half of the girls in Malawi were married before they reach 18, and ranked Malawi as having one of the highest rates of child marriages in the world, with particularly high rates in rural areas. Young girls, sometimes as young as seven, are subject to sexually abusive traditions that include sexual initiation camps for kusasa fumbi (cleansing).
In 2015, Malawi passed a law that forbade marriage before the age of 18.
However, the constitution and the customary law administered by the traditional authorities still say that children can marry if the parents agree.

Kachindamoto was disturbed when she found high rates of child marriage in her district. She could not persuade parents to change their views, but had the 50 sub-chiefs in the district agree to abolish early marriage and annul existing unions. She fired four sub-chiefs responsible for areas where child marriages continued, later reinstating them when she had confirmation that these marriages had been annulled. She convinced community leaders to change the civil code to ban early marriage.
As of 2019, she had managed to have over 3,500 early marriages annulled.
Her actions have brought her international recognition.

In June 2015, she told Maravi Post, "I have terminated 330 marriages, yes, of which 175 were girl-wives and 155 were boy-fathers. I wanted them to go back to school and that has worked." She told Nyasa Times, "I don't want youthful marriages, they must go to school. We have now set our own laws to govern everybody within my area when it comes to marriages and will leave no sacred cow. ... No child should be found loitering at home; gardening or doing any house hold chores during school time. No village head, GVH or church clergy to officiate marriage before scrutinizing the birth dates of the couple."

The marriages that were annulled were customary ones, regulated by chiefs, rather than civil marriages.
Chief Kachindamoto worked with groups of mothers, teachers, village development committees, religious leaders and non-government organizations. 
She met resistance from parents and the couples themselves, particularly poor parents when a dowry had been paid.
She felt that the door-to-door campaign was the largest factor in gaining agreement for annulment of the unions.
UN Women and UNICEF plan to work with traditional leaders elsewhere to replicate the best practices of Chief Kachindamoto in reducing child marriages. Kachindamoto says, "Educate a girl and you educate the whole area ... You educate the world".

Notes

Sources

Malawian women
Child marriage
Living people
Year of birth missing (living people)
People from Dedza District